Brenner may refer to:
 Brenner (surname)
 Brenner (crater)
 Brenner (TV series), a television series from 1959 to 1964
 Brenner, South Tyrol, a municipality in South Tyrol, Austria
 Brenner, Kansas, a community in the United States
 Brenner Pass, a pass through the Alps, linking Italy and Austria
 Brenner Base Tunnel, a railway tunnel through the base of the Brenner massif
 Brenner Railway
 Brenner Regional Council, a regional council in Israel
 Brenner tumour
 Brenner (footballer, born 1999), Brenner Alves Sabino, Brazilian football forward for Iwate Grulla Morioka
 Brenner (footballer, born 2000), Brenner Souza da Silva, Brazilian football forward for FC Cincinnati

See also
 Brenna (disambiguation)
 Givat Brenner, a kibbutz in Israel
 Crick, Brenner et al. experiment